Uvariodendron giganteum is a species of plant in the family Annonaceae. It is found in Cameroon and Gabon. Its natural habitat is subtropical or tropical moist lowland forests. It is threatened by habitat loss. Plant is a forest tree up to 30 ft. high. Flowers yellow and purple within.

References

 http://annonaceae.myspecies.info/taxonomy/term/417/media

giganteum
Vulnerable plants
Flora of Cameroon
Flora of Gabon
Taxonomy articles created by Polbot